This is a list of the characters that belong to the Touhou Project, a series of danmaku and fighting video games by ZUN from Team Shanghai Alice. Most Touhou characters reside in a fictional realm called Gensokyo ('Land of Illusions'), where humans and yōkai coexist. Gensokyo's culture are like those of feudal Japan, but the Touhou games take place in the present day. Many yōkai prey on and eat humans, and humans subsequently try to exorcise them, but no racial resentment exists between the two. The characters in the Touhou Project have unique abilities, and many of them are based on Japanese folklore and religion.

All characters, except for the two main protagonists Reimu and Marisa, are listed by the first game of their appearance. Reimu first appeared in the first game, Highly Responsive to Prayers, and Marisa in the second, Story in Eastern Wonderland.

Protagonists
Reimu Hakurei

Species: Human
Ability: Flight, using yin-yang orbs, and godly powers. Ability as the Hakurei Miko.
Residence: Hakurei Shrine
 is the main protagonist of the series, appearing in some role in every Touhou game to date, and is almost always available as a playable character. She is seen on the cover art of all of the PC-98 games, and is on the title screen for most of the Windows games. Despite the fact she's never done any training of any sort, she is fairly strong. Because of this, she does not believe at all that hard work pays off, and hates putting in large amounts of effort. Since her freedom is to the level of the impossible, she has a negative disposition. As she has a simple and straightforward personality, her human emotions are wild, and she often has hasty conversations. She has a strange atmosphere that attracts others regardless of whether they are human or yōkai.『永夜抄』付属のマニュアル Since her job is yōkai extermination, she takes a stern pose against yōkai, but she herself does not have a particular interest in humans or yōkai, and depending on the circumstances, is willing to help, or attack either. In Silent Sinner in Blue, she looked after the fainted yōkai rabbit, and in Curiosities of Lotus Asia, made a surprise attack on a harmless yōkai who was reading her book, and stole it. Since she likes yōkai extermination itself, when incidents do not occur for a long time, she grows irritated due to boredom. This is a personality that strong yōkai especially like, but since she exterminates yōkai, sometimes without prior conversation or warning, she is feared by the weaker yōkai. It is a carefree personality, but on the opposite side of her impartial nature, she does not see anyone as a companion, and even when she acts together with other humans or yōkai, she is always alone. As she is ruthless in her job, especially in the middle of yōkai extermination, she exterminates the yōkai and fairies she comes across without mercy. She is also similar to Alice Margatroid as she chooses not to show her true power due to the fact there would be nothing being left afterwards if she lost a battle with her full power. She is fairly tall.

From Rinnosuke Morichika's viewpoint, she has good relations with Marisa Kirisame. However, she has never fought alongside Marisa, and in Imperishable Night, Reimu fights Marisa for getting in her way. When Reimu confronted Watatsuki no Yorihime in Silent Sinner in Blue, she did not cooperate with her allies.

She serves the role of the miko of the Hakurei Shrine, located at the boundary between Gensokyo and the Outside World, called the "Miko of Hakurei." The job of the miko of the Hakurei Shrine is to exterminate yōkai and resolve incidents, and Reimu herself possesses considerable power, but since she habitually lives a life of drinking tea and taking naps, she does not have enough training. Gensokyo is sustained by the maintenance of the indispensable relationship of yōkai attacking humans and humans exterminating yōkai, of which the Miko of Hakurei plays a part. Since the Miko of Hakurei is also in an indispensable position of maintaining Gensokyo, it has become forbidden for the Miko of Hakurei to exterminate yōkai and for yōkai to attack the miko, as well as humans coming to the Hakurei Shrine grounds to meddle. However, since the relation of yōkai attacking humans has thus been lost, yōkai have been in decline, so Reimu approved of a request she received from yōkai to establish battle rules for bouts with yōkai to kill time, thus preserving the relation between yōkai and humans in a mock style, allowing strong and weak ones to have fights on equal ground, called the "spell card rules" in the "Spell Naming Law."スペルカードも参照 The customs related to the job have been preserved from time immemorial without fail, and as she follows the custom, she takes an attitude of not worrying about the results.

Reimu's appearance varies slightly between the games. However, she always can be seen with black or brown hair with a red bow (the length of her hair changes between games), the Purification Rod, a gohei created by Rinnosuke Morichika, and a red and white hakama with a long skirt. The hakama is unconventional in its appearance due to the fact that the sleeves are detached, exposing her armpits, which has become the subject of an Internet meme. In 2006, dōjin music group IOSYS, who make Touhou-themed music parodies, released the song Tsukiyo wo Kakusanai Teido no Nouryoku?, which made frequent usage of the line "Waki miko Reimu" (armpit miko Reimu), leading to an unofficial nickname.

Her main abilities are flight, good intuition, and getting along with everyone; even those who were once her enemies. In the games, she is characterized by her homing amulets and yin-yang orbs. In addition to being in all of the Touhou games (apart from Shoot the Bullet and Fairy Wars), she also appears in Graffiti Kingdom as "Flying Maiden", a game which ZUN helped to develop.

Marisa Kirisame

Species: Human
Ability: Magic (Hakkero)
Residence: Forest of Magic
 is a human magician who lives in a cluttered house in the Forest of Magic. She is friends with Reimu and visits her often, but is otherwise solitary and spends most of her time researching magic. She is an avid collector, hoarding almost any item she comes across, often "borrowing" things without permission from various characters. She talks in a direct, and often rude way, highlighting her tomboyish nature and otherwise carefree attitude. While she is prone to violence, selfishness, and other disagreeable behaviors, she is an honest and hard worker, usually on the front lines of defending Gensokyo whenever an incident occurs. She is contrasted with Reimu, the naturally-talented protagonist, as Marisa's powers derive entirely from hard work and determination rather than any abilities she was born with, and it's said that she wins her fights with Reimu "about 40% of the time." In the games, her attacks are characterized by five-pointed stars and lasers, and other high-level destructive magic. Reflecting her "borrowing" habit, many of her spells are inspired by other characters, such as her signature move "Master Spark" which was originally Yuuka Kazami's, or her "Nondirectional Laser" attack, which was originally Patchouli's attack. Her habitual stealing also corresponds to gameplay, as she is the best character for collecting power-ups due to her high speed. She is fairly short.

Additional game characters

Highly Responsive to Prayers

The Stage 5 boss. The gatekeeper of the Hakurei Shrine. Has three forms: a yin yang, a priestess, or a priest.

The Stage 10 boss of the Makai route. A hovering set of evil eyes, connected by electricity.

Species: Devil
Residence: Ruins of Vina
The Innocent Devil, Stage 15 boss of the Makai route.

Species: Angel
Residence: Fallen Shrine
The Angel of Death, final boss of the Makai route.

Species: Vengeful Spirit 
Ability: Black Magic
Residence: Hakurei Shrine
First appearing as the Stage 10 boss of the Jigoku route, Mima returns in later PC-98 games with more significant roles. She is a ghost that haunts the area around the Hakurei Shrine. She is very confident in her abilities, and even boastful of them. Although she claims during Story of Eastern Wonderland to want revenge against the entire human race, it's not known precisely what Mima's motivations for that are. She is also attempting to revive herself. Although she is often called a ghost, during Phantasmagoria of Dim. Dream, Mima denies being dead and tries to explain that she is "just a soul."

Stage 15 boss of the Jigoku route. Also named the "Hellish Moon", she is a bronze moon-like orb surrounded by a sickly purple aura and engraved with the image of a young girl.

The Astral Knight, final boss of the Jigoku route.

Story of Eastern Wonderland

Species: Turtle
Ability: Flight
Residence: Hakurei Shrine
Reimu's pet turtle that she caught during her training. As he lived for a very long time, he has gained many mystic powers, one of which is flight. Reimu rides on him to fly in all the PC-98 games from Story of Eastern Wonderland onwards, but from Embodiment of Scarlet Devil onwards, she learned to fly by herself, and Genjii has not been seen since then. ZUN has confirmed during an interview that Genjii lives in the pond behind the Hakurei Shrine.

Species: Human
An engineer in Gensokyo that is the boss of Stage 1 and the Extra Stage. She pilots the "Flower Tank" on stage one and "Evil Eye Sigma" on the extra stage. Unlike many other scrolling shooters where mechs are the primary enemy, Rika is the only character in the series to pilot vehicles in a boss fight.

Species: Human
Residence: Forest of Magic
A female samurai that is the Stage 2 boss. She is seeking the power of the Hakurei family.

Phantasmagoria of Dim. Dream

Species: Witch
Ability: Inability to grow old, magic
Ellen is a witch with the power of eternal youth. She has lived so long that she never remembers anything. She has a cat named Sokrates. She has a cameo in the manga Hatarakimono by Izumi Takemoto, who ZUN is a fan of.

Species: Human
A princess who claims to be a police officer, but her behavior and attitude suggests otherwise. She is known to be a collector in things other people have no interest in.

Species: Poltergeist
A one-sided poltergeist created by a mentally unstable girl. As the inhabitants of her house have stopped taking any notice of her, she is looking for another place to haunt.

Species: Human
One of the few believers in science in Gensokyo. However, she is also a considerably powerful magic user. Though she does not particularly like magic, she combines it with science, as the powers of science alone are insufficient. She is the only meganekko in the PC-98 series, but others appeared in the Windows games.

Species: Human
Ability: Artificial Magic
Residence: Probability Space Hypervessel 
Age: 15
Yumemi's assistant who acts overly familiar towards her, and their relationship is apparently more complex than one of a typical boss and subordinate. Although she looks too young to be an assistant professor, it's because she earned her Ph.D. (in comparative physics) at the age of 15. She speaks unusually, especially for a young girl. Most of her mannerisms were later adopted by Marisa.

Species: Human
Ability: Artificial Magic
Residence: Probability Space Hypervessel 
Professor of comparative physics at an unnamed university in a world beyond Gensokyo. In this world, a grand unification theory has been developed; when Yumemi presented an expanded theory that included magic to her academic society, she was ridiculed. She came to Gensokyo to do research and make her case infallible.

Species: Robot
Residence: Hakurei Shrine
A nuclear-powered maid that Reimu requested in the ending of Phantasmagoria of Dim. Dream. She is the only non-controllable and non-fightable character to have appeared in an official Touhou game.

Lotus Land Story

Species: Yōkai
Residence: Mountain Path
An insignificant yōkai who happened to be in the wrong place at the wrong time. In game, her name appears as two question marks, and "Orange" is only revealed in the character profiles of the game.

 

Species: Vampire
Residence: Lake of Blood
Kurumi is a vampiress that lives on an island in the center of the Lake of Blood. She guards the lake and prevents others from passing by unhindered.

 

Residence: Mugenkan
Elly is the gate guard of Mugenkan. Though seemingly powerful, the mansion rarely has any visitors, and thus her danmaku abilities are out of practice.

Species: Yōkai
Residence: Mugenkan
Yuuka is a powerful yōkai who lives in a mansion, Mugenkan, on the boundary between the Dream World and the real world. In Lotus Land Story, an unknown act of hers radiated magical power across the worlds, sending the evil spirits in Reimu's shrine into a frenzy, which also got the attention of Marisa. She is often seen carrying a parasol, which is capable of firing the Kyokutai Laser. This laser is later adopted by Marisa as her signature Master Spark.For her later appearance in Phantasmagoria of Flower View, see Yuuka Kazami.

Species: Demon
A human-looking, blonde-haired girl in a maid uniform. Younger twin sister of Gengetsu. Although she is dressed like a servant, she tells the player characters that the area in which they fight is her world; she does not appear to work for anyone.

Species: Demon
A blonde girl who dresses in pink, with red bows and white, angel-like wings. Older twin sister of Mugetsu, and the stronger of the two.

Mystic Square

Species: Yōkai
Residence: A mountain cave that holds a doorway to Makai
The gatekeeper of Makai. Her name comes from a character in Izumi Takemoto's short manga Crystal Egg.

Species: Demon
Residence: Makai
A resident of Makai, she attacks the main characters as they are invading. Her name comes from a character in Izumi Takemoto's short manga Downtown Stories: Rooftop Serenade.

Species: Yōkai magician
Ability: Magic, Manipulation of Dolls
Residence: Makai
A girl whose powers come from the forbidden "Grimoire of Alice" and is mostly powerless without it. She first appears in Stage 3, and after being defeated by the protagonist, returns in the Extra Stage. She is a reference to the Alices of Shin Megami Tensei, Asura Blade: Sword of Dynasty, and Alice in Wonderland.

For her later appearances in the Windows games, see Alice Margatroid.

Species: Magician
Ability: Fire Magic
Residence: Makai
A black witch who appears with Mai on the fourth stage, and is angered when Mai is defeated before she is. Specializes in fire magic.

Species: Magician
Ability: Ice Magic
Residence: Makai
A white witch who appears with Yuki on the fourth stage, and fights more seriously when Yuki is defeated before her. Specializes in ice magic.

Species: Demon
Residence: Pandæmonium
A sword-throwing maid who serves Shinki, she is ranked as one of the top class inhabitants of Makai. 

Species: Goddess
Residence: Pandæmonium
The creator of Makai. Because she is the creator of everything in Makai, the residents of Makai see her as God. As the final boss, she personally delivers the punishment on the four intruders of Makai.

Embodiment of Scarlet Devil

Species: Yōkai
Ability: Manipulation of darkness
Boss of Stage 1. She is a yōkai who has the physical appearance of a young girl. She has blond hair, red eyes, wears black clothing, and her hair is wrapped in a red ribbon. This ribbon is an ofuda, and Rumia herself cannot touch it. She is short.ZUNによれば、「game_1522.lzh」で説明されている登場人物に関して「身長は大体成長期の10代前半の少女達となります」とのことである。「高」は人間でいえば「10代後半以降程度の身長」、「低」は「10代前半の人間だとしたらかなり低い部類」となる。

Her ability is to create a sphere of night around her, but as it impairs her own vision significantly, it is not useful in combat. She usually spends her days fluttering around aimlessly.

Species: Fairy
Residence: Misty Lake
Stage 2 mid-boss. A minor character, who received no in-game profile; fans named her Daiyousei (lit. "Big/Great Fairy"). ZUN later described her as bright, playful, and expressive. Sometimes appears in dōjinshi with Cirno.

 
Species: Ice fairy
Ability: Enough power to manipulate ice
Residence: Misty Lake
Stage 2 boss, and a playable character in Touhou Hisōtensoku, Fairy Wars, and Hidden Star in Four Seasons. An ice fairy that lives on the lake surrounding the Scarlet Devil Mansion. Although she is weak from the player's perspective, appearing only as the 2nd stage boss, and a Stage 1 midboss in Perfect Cherry Blossom and Double Dealing Character. She is one of the strongest fairies in Gensokyo. Regardless, her weakness and low intelligence compared to most others in Gensokyo, and her bravery leads her to be the subject of mockery. Her hobby is freezing frogs and watching them revive as they thaw, but she tends to shatter them instead by accident. Unlike Letty Whiterock, she radiates cold air all year-round, and can stay awake even in the spring and summer. She is short.

She is often called "⑨" (pronounced "nineball") by fans, and the character "⑨" is regarded as a symbol of "Baka" (Stupid), since ZUN labeled her as such in the manual of Phantasmagoria of Flower View.

Species: Yōkai
Ability: Manipulation of qi
Residence: Scarlet Devil Mansion
Stage 3 boss. A Chinese girl serving as the door guard of the Scarlet Devil Mansion. Canonically, she is known to be a very humanoid yōkai who practices martial arts, but is generally friendly towards humans. Her name has been the subject of confusion in the fanbase, as Japanese fans were not sure whether to read her name in Japanese (Kurenai Misuzu), or in Chinese (Hong Meiling). Some people chose to simply call her Chūgoku (China), a name that she's still sometimes called, though ZUN has confirmed during a Q&A at Meiji University that the Chinese reading of Hong Meiling is correct. This is referenced in Immaterial and Missing Power, wherein one of her win quotes is "please remember my name." In dōjinshi, she is usually portrayed as a joke character, constantly being abused by the other residents of the Scarlet Devil Mansion in a humorous fashion, especially Sakuya. She is one of the more popular Touhou characters, and was added as a playable character in a patch for Immaterial and Missing Power, despite not having a story of her own. In Touhou Hisōtensoku, she is reintroduced as a playable character with her own storyline. She has aqua-colored eyes and long, scarlet hair that symbolizes the place that she's guarding. Her outfit is traditionally Chinese, composed of a Cheongsam, and a beret with a star that reads dragon (龍) in Chinese. She is tall.

Species: Devil
Residence: Scarlet Devil Mansion
Stage 4 mid-boss. Similar to Daiyousei, she received no character profile in the game and was named Koakuma (lit. "Little Devil") by fans. However, she is popular for a relatively obscure character. ZUN later described her to be like Daiyousei (whimsical, enjoys pranks, and acts without thinking). He also added that while devils are as powerful as vampires and magicians, Koakuma is a rather weak one, therefore, she is a Koakuma (Little Devil). She lives in the Scarlet Devil Mansion, and is thought to be an assistant to Patchouli Knowledge of some sort, but no specific details have been given.

Species: Witch
Ability: Able to manipulate elemental magic, like fire, water, wood, metal, earth, sun, and the moon
Residence: Scarlet Devil Mansion
Stage 4 boss, and a playable character in Immaterial and Missing Power, Scarlet Weather Rhapsody, and Hisoutensoku. A scholar who is a friend of Remilia Scarlet. She resides in the library of the Scarlet Devil Mansion, and is the de facto librarian. In fact, she rarely leaves it and is somewhat of a hikikomori, choosing not to leave because the sun damages her hair or the books. She has command over the seven elements (which the Japanese days of the week are named after, making her the "One-week Wizard") and is theoretically an extremely powerful magician. Patchouli is the name of a plant, from which oils and perfumes can be made, and the surname Knowledge is a rather literal reference to her studious nature. However, her constitution is very poor and asthma often prevents her from reciting her spells. This is also reflected in the fighting games, where she moves slowly, and likes to keep a distance between herself and her opponent. She has a bitter relationship with Marisa, who tends to 'borrow' her books without asking. She is fairly short.

Species: Human
Ability: Manipulation of time
Residence: Scarlet Devil Mansion
Stage 5 boss, and a playable character in Perfect Cherry Blossom, Imperishable Night, Phantasmagoria of Flower View, Double Dealing Character, Immaterial and Missing Power, Scarlet Weather Rhapsody, Hisoutensoku, and Unconnected Marketeers. She is the head maid of the Scarlet Devil Mansion.

Sakuya is the only human living in the Scarlet Devil Mansion,『三月精 第2部』「上海アリス通信 三精版 第5号」（『月刊コンプエース』Vol.7 p.275。実質的には「第6号」なのだが誤植で「第5号」になっている。単行本未収録）。 and is responsible for its upkeep. She uses humble speech to her mistress Remilia Scarlet and friend Patchouli Knowledge, but speaks less formally with others.

She is tall. The color of her eyes changes with each work, and ZUN has stated that "she plays the role of a human maid about 10-20 years old" and "perhaps she is a character in her early teens", and in Perfect Memento in Strict Sense, according to Hieda no Akyuu, "she claims to be in her late teens."

Sakuya has the ability to manipulate time. Furthermore, it also seems she is able to change the speed at which time flows. However, as it is difficult to reverse events that have already occurred, and since she is not able to return broken things to how they were originally even if she reversed time, in actuality, it is not possible for her to reverse time.『香霖堂』単行本第4-5話 However, she is able to do things to an extent of moving things back to where they were originally. She is also able to manipulate space, which is closely related to time.

Sakuya possesses a great amount of silver『永夜抄』付属のマニュアル。 throwing knives and is able to throw them with great accuracy. With her ability to manipulate time, she is able to conjure knives from out of nowhere. According to ZUN, it seems like her throwing knife arm and her cooking arm are comparable, and therefore she is skilled at cooking.

She was not born in Gensokyo, and the name "Sakuya Izayoi" was given to her by Remilia Scarlet. In Perfect Memento in Strict Sense, Akyuu guessed that she might have originally been a vampire hunter. A recurring joke with Sakuya in dōjinshi usually involves her stabbing Hong Meiling mercilessly with her knives, usually due to Meiling's laziness or inability to keep unwanted visitors, such as Reimu and Marisa, out of the mansion. However, Sakuya does care for Meiling's well-being, and the two have a close relationship, as demonstrated in Eastern and Little Nature Deity / Strange and Bright Nature Deity.

At the time of Embodiment of Scarlet Devil, she merely worked at the Scarlet Devil Mansion in return for food. Continuing in Imperishable Night, she did not worry about the clothing, food, or housing at all and simply felt satisfied and utterly devoted to her mistress, Remilia.『永夜抄』付属の「キャラ設定.txt」。

Species: Vampire
Age: Approximately 500 years
Ability: Manipulation of fate
Residence: Scarlet Devil Mansion
Final boss, and a playable character in Immaterial and Missing Power, Imperishable Night, Scarlet Weather Rhapsody, and Hisoutensoku. Remilia is the vampiric mistress of the Scarlet Devil Mansion who claims to be descended from Vlad III Dracula, and her prelude theme song is titled The Young Descendant of Tepes, referencing his Romanian name, Vlad Tepes, but she has no actual connection to him. She is known as the Scarlet Devil as when she feeds, the blood of her victims stains her dress scarlet. Apart from her unpleasant needs, she is hardly malicious enough to deserve such a title; as though she is over 500 years old, and has appropriate wisdom, her attitude is comparable to that of a young child. Although being a vampire is normally a lonely life, she has a good relationship with her many employees (including Sakuya and Meiling). Reimu is one of the few humans who tolerates her, and Remilia seems quite fond of her in turn. Marisa also gets along with her in exchange for access to her library. Her power is the control of fate (which has never been overtly demonstrated in the games). She prefers melee fighting to danmaku, but when she does resort to the latter, she is fond of red bullets and knives. She is short. 

Species: Vampire
Age: Over 495 years
Ability: Enough power to destroy anything
Residence: Scarlet Devil Mansion
Extra Stage boss, and a playable character in Sunken Fossil World. Remilia's little sister, she is not allowed to leave the mansion's basement, and knows very little about life on the outside. This doesn't upset Flandre - she likes her sister and usually doesn't try escaping. However, because of this fact, Flandre is generally ignorant. Most vampires hold back somewhat when fighting humans, as they plan to keep them alive and feed from them later, but Flandre was always fed prepared dishes and does not know her food comes from humans. Thus, when fighting them, she does not hesitate and incinerates them without a second thought. In dōjinshi, she is very fond of Reimu and Marisa and is often portrayed as somewhat crazy, though alternate portrayals as a sweet "Little Sister"-type are also popular. She is short.

Her theme music, "U.N. Owen Was Her?" was based on the book And Then There Were None by Agatha Christie. "U.N. Owen" was a mysterious figure known to scheme people in the novel.

Perfect Cherry Blossom

Species: Yuki-onna
Ability: Manipulation of chilliness
Stage 1 boss. She is a yōkai who only appears during winter. In Perfect Memento in Strict Sense, it was written that she was a type of yuki-onna.

She is fairly tall.

She possesses an ability to manipulate chilliness. According to Perfect Memento in Strict Sense, since this is equivalent to an ability that manipulates the winter within nature, she possesses tremendous power according to the environment, but she is mostly powerless outside of winter. In Bohemian Archive in Japanese Red, Letty herself said that outside of winter, she hides away in a place where "not a ray of sunlight can reach."
Her name is a reference to Letitia "Letty" Blacklock, a character from A Murder is Announced, by Agatha Christie.

Species: Beast (Bakeneko possessed as Shikigami)
Ability: Sorcery (while possessed as shikigami), surprising people (as bakeneko)
Residence: Yōkai Mountain
Stage 2 boss and Extra Stage midboss. She has two tails and is a bakeneko yokai. She is also Ran Yakumo's shikigami, but since Ran herself is a shikigami of Yukari Yakumo, she is a "shikigami of a shikigami" from Yukari's viewpoint. She is short.

Chen, as a bakeneko, acquires powers of a wrathful god while possessed, but since the one of whom she is a shikigami of, Ran, is also a shikigami, her strength is fairly low. This shikigami possession is removed when she is soaked in water, and due to being a cat as well, she generally dislikes being in water regardless.

She originally lives in Yōkai Mountain. In Bohemian Archive in Japanese Red, she made the village of cats and tried to stand as the leader, but was not able to achieve any worthwhile results.

Species: Magician
Ability: Manipulation and creation of magical dolls
Residence: Forest of Magic
Alice is a magician who lives in the Forest of Magic. She is a playable character in Imperishable Night, Subterranean Animism, Immaterial and Missing Power, Scarlet Weather Rhapsody, and Hisoutensoku.Alice has blonde hair and pale skin, and at first glance she has the appearance of a doll. She is "fairly tall." She wears a frilly white and blue dress, and a red headband. The color of her eyes changes with each work.

She is an all-purpose-type of magician without any major strengths or weaknesses. With a personality that is indifferent to other people, she is attached to magic, and is usually confident, but timid.

According to Perfect Memento in Strict Sense, Alice was originally a human, and upon completion of some training, she became a magician. It has not been long since the day she has become a magician, and because of this, she still continues human habits like eating and sleeping that aren't entirely necessary.

As her speciality is making dolls, she is also able to manipulate a great amount of dolls at the same time, and she is one of the best dollmakers in Gensokyo. She is able to make her dolls move with as much fluidity as any human, and she can make multiple dolls perform different actions, sometimes making them cooperate and sometimes making them move completely asynchronously, to such an extent that to onlookers around her, it might not seem like she is manipulating them. The dolls are also able to manipulate other dolls, but Alice does not use them to assist her when creating new dolls, opting to do it entirely herself.

She has a residence in the Forest of Magic. According to Perfect Memento in Strict Sense, since she was originally a human, even as a yōkai, she has a high understanding and friendship towards humans and presents a low danger level, and if someone gets lost in the forest, she gladly gives shelter. However, Alice's house is covered all over with dolls, and since she is not very eager for conversation, it seems like she immediately flees when there is something eerie. However, she is not hostile, and in Strange and Bright Nature Deity, the Three Fairies of Light accidentally arrived at her house, and Alice was hospitable to them.

According to Perfect Memento in Strict Sense, she does not perform the usual act of attacking humans, but likes fights and upon receiving a challenge to do battle, gladly accepts. As she manipulates a great number of combat dolls, the challenger is likely to be highly outnumbered, making a difficult battle inevitable, but she has the weakness of having to use her hands to manipulate the dolls, and thereby cannot engage in combat directly.

Since she does not find it enjoyable to win battles with overwhelming power, she usually fights with power that is only slightly greater than that of the opponent. Furthermore, it would be problematic were she to be defeated while putting forth the extent of her power, and so she does not give it her all in fights, in which respect she is similar to Reimu Hakurei.

In the character settings text for Imperishable Night, it was written that she was an indoors type who was often alone, but in Perfect Memento in Strict Sense, the range of her place of activities is set to "any kind of place" in Gensokyo, and she also appeared in front of people in times of festivals to exhibit her skill with dolls. Additionally, while she is reclusive in character, in the only mainline Touhou games in which she's a playable character, she fights alongside Marisa. In each ending of Imperishable Night and Immaterial and Missing Power, she participated in banquets at the Hakurei Shrine. It was also hinted that she sometimes visits the library of the Scarlet Devil Mansion.

According to ZUN's comments in the Music Room of Perfect Cherry Blossom, Alice is a special character of the Touhou series, and because of that, he composed her theme with renewed vigor.

Species: Fairy
Ability: Can recognise the coming of spring
A fairy that heralds the arrival of spring. However, since she expresses herself with danmaku rather than words, her announcement is usually seen as a hostile attack. She is the first midboss to receive an official character profile. In the "Muenzuka" stage of Phantasmasgoria of Flower View, a black version of Lily White shows up instead of the normal version. Fans have named her Lily Black, and gave her a darker character as opposed to the cheerful Lily White.

Species: Poltergeists
Ability: Playing musical instruments without hands or feet
Residence: Poltergeist Mansion
Bosses of Stage 4. They are poltergeists in the shape of three bards. They were originally daughters of a human noble, but an unfortunate event caused his four daughters to separate. The fourth daughter, Layla Prismriver, was unable to leave the mansion that held so many of her memories. Using her power, she conjured poltergeists with the appearance of her older sisters, then slowly became forgotten along with the mansion and the poltergeists. Even though the humans died with the passage of time, the poltergeists remain in the mansion. The three Prismriver Sisters, now musical performers of some note, were employed by Yuyuko Saigyouji to provide entertainment for the upcoming flower-viewing. The protagonists encounter them at the gate to the netherworld.

Ability: Power to play melancholic notes
The eldest of the Prismriver Sisters. She plays the violin and prefers solo performances. She can also play 'melancholic notes', which can bring people or yōkai into a state of depression, but Lyrica's playing negates this effect, meaning it only has an impact when she plays solos. Honest to a fault, she is perhaps the most well-adjusted of the sisters. The player fights her first if the player is playing as Reimu. She is fairly short.

Ability: Power to play maniac notes
The middle child of the Prismriver Sisters. She plays the trumpet, and can perform 'maniac notes', which brings the listener into a state of euphoria and vitality. Her magic is the strongest of the three sisters, but her technique is not very good. Despite this, she is cheerful and tends to obsess over things. The player fights her first if the player is playing as Sakuya. She is fairly short.

Ability: Power to play illusionary notes
The youngest of the poltergeist Prismriver Sisters. Although skilled with all instruments, she prefers keyboard and percussion. Neither her keyboard nor her 'illusionary notes' exist in the natural world, and has no major effect beyond making the other two sisters' performance more enjoyable. She is clever and manipulative, usually goading her older sisters into doing her fighting rather than engaging in battle herself. The player fights her first if the player is playing as Marisa. She is short.

 

Species: Half-human half-phantom
Age: Under 60 years
Ability: Kenjutsu
Residence: Hakugyokurō
Stage 5 boss and Stage 6 midboss, and a playable character in Imperishable Night, Phantasmagoria of Flower View, Ten Desires, Wily Beast and Weakest Creature, Immaterial and Missing Power, Scarlet Weather Rhapsody, and Hisoutensoku. Youmu is a gardener attached to the Saigyouji family and the bodyguard of Yuyuko Saigyouji, and a practitioner of a two-sword school of fencing.

One sword is the Roukanken, which possesses power to kill ten yuurei in one slash, carried by Youmu from her left shoulder to her right waist, and she carries the Hakurouken on her left waist, which slices through people's confusion. The longer sword is the Roukanken, and it has been conveyed that it was forged by yōkai. The shorter sword is the Hakurouken, which seems to be the heirloom of the Konpaku family.

According to the Saigyouji family, Youmu is the second generation to take her position, the former generation being Youki Konpaku. Youki was Youmu's fencing shishō (instructor). Youmu is also Yuyuko's sword instructor, but she is fundamentally treated as a gardener.

Youmu wears a dark green and white dress, which sometimes contains baldricks for her various swords, and she has short, white hair. She is "fairly short." The color of her eyes changes after Perfect Cherry Blossom and Imperishable Night. As she is a mixture of human and yuurei, she has a half-human half-yōkai existence, and the large yuurei (hanyuurei, hanrei) that always follows her is the yuurei half of her body. In Perfect Memento in Strict Sense, Youmu (the one taking the appearance as a girl) was treated as "half-human half-yuurei," and the yuurei was treated as "yuurei," and it was supposed that Youmu (the half-human half-yuurei) manipulates the yuurei consciously. Youmu has a lower body temperature compared to normal humans and a higher body temperature compared to normal yuurei. In the Imperishable Night manual, it was written, "she has two kinds of body: human and yuurei," showing Youmu to be "human" and the yuurei to be "yuurei.""

Those who are a mixture of human and yuurei are a species with long lifespan,『永夜抄』付属の「キャラ設定.txt」。 but in Seasonal Dream Vision, it was revealed that she was under 60 years of age, and in Phantasmagoria of Flower View, she was unfamiliar with the "flower incident that occurs once every 60 years."

As she has a straightforward and diligent personality, she is often manipulated by those around her (especially Yuyuko). For this reason, she often fails at her task, but that does not mean that she has no real power, and she especially excels at instantaneous force and concentration of power. In Immaterial and Missing Power, as literally stated by the shishō, "truth-slashing is something which you know," so she often performs tsujigiri-like moves, but Suika Ibuki pointed out that she does not think that Youmu understood her shishō's teachings.

Youmu is highly sensitive, and in the good ending of Imperishable Night, upon receiving the insanity of the moon, she became affected with eyes of insanity. She is afraid of dares, the darkness, and ghosts. However, she is calm with regards to yuurei since she is half yuurei herself. At one point in Ten Desires, as a result of being mistaken for a hermit, she temporarily believed she was one.

In Perfect Cherry Blossom, she gathered all of Gensokyo's spring at Yuyuko's instruction, which was the reason Gensokyo's winter did not end. In Bohemian Archive in Japanese Red and Curiosities of Lotus Asia, she took on the responsibility for collecting and returning the yuurei that have gone to Gensokyo as a result of the thinning of the barrier of the Netherworld.

Species: Ghost
Age: At least 1000 years
Ability: Manipulation of death and departed souls
Residence: Hakugyokurō
Final Stage boss, Stage 1 boss of Ten Desires, and a playable character in Imperishable Night, Immaterial and Missing Power, Scarlet Weather Rhapsody, and Hisoutensoku. Yuyuko is the princess of the netherworld pagoda, Hakugyokurō. She is a ghost, but unlike most of her kind, looks entirely human. She was a human, cursed with the power to bring death to others; this ability caused her to eventually commit suicide using her life to seal away an ancient evil residing in a yōkai cherry blossom tree. Living in the netherworld, she doesn't socialize much with the rest of Gensokyo, apart from her gardener Youmu, the only person she speaks to is Yukari. Her family name Saigyouji suggests relations with the famed poet Saigyo. Yuyuko, at first appearance, is a ditz; her mental processes seem to be dedicated mainly to teasing her gardener and servant, Youmu, and anticipating her next meal. However, her usual manner conceals a sharp mind and an almost prenatural depth of insight. For example, she was the only one to perceive what sort of being Fujiwara no Mokou was at first sight. Yuyuko has the power to invoke death to any mortal; however, she rarely chooses to use it. Her danmaku are characterized by butterfly-shaped bullets. She is fairly tall.

Species: Shikigami (Kitsune)
Ability: Power to use shikigami
Residence: The boundaries of Gensokyo
Extra stage boss and Phantasm stage midboss. A nine-tailed fox yōkai whom Yukari Yakumo made her shikigami. She is considerably powerful even without her master's support. Among other things, she uses this power to maintain her own shikigami, Chen. Since Yukari sleeps 12 hours a day, she handles the work during these times. In dōjinshi, she is often depicted as a harassed servant, doing all of the work for her lazy master. She is fairly tall.

Species: Yōkai
Ability: Manipulation of space and boundaries
Residence: The boundaries of Gensokyo
Phantasm stage boss, and playable character in Imperishable Night, Subterranean Animism, Immaterial and Missing Power, Scarlet Weather Rhapsody, Hisoutensoku, and Antinomy of Common Flowers. Yukari is an elder yōkai who dwells on the border of Gensokyo, and may predate the existence of the realm itself. A good friend of Yuyuko and an acquaintance of Reimu, she is the self-appointed stewardess of the seal between Gensokyo and the Outside World, but doesn't do a particularly good job of it. Most of the time, she is asleep, leaving all the work to her shikigami Ran and Chen. When she isn't, she tends to amuse herself by pulling in unprepared humans from the outside world and stranding them in Gensokyo, with no apparent way for them to return. Her calculation and mathematical skills far exceeds that of Ran, being Ran's master, making her one of the most intelligent yōkai, and, one of the most powerful - Rinnosuke suggests that no yōkai or human could defeat her in battle. Her ability is the manipulation of boundaries, which refers to both physical and metaphorical boundaries, which also distinguish her spell cards. Often, though, she just summons her shikigami and various others to create her danmaku for her. She is tall.

Immaterial and Missing Power

Species: Oni
Ability: Manipulation of density and sparseness
Residence: Gensokyo, often seen at Yokai Mountain and the Hakurei Shrine, exact location unknown
Main antagonist of Immaterial and Missing Power, a playable character in Scarlet Weather Rhapsody, and a support character to Reimu in Subterranean Animism, her only appearance in a mainline Touhou game. Suika is an oni, and once part of the Four Devas of the Mountains, alongside Yuugi Hoshiguma and Kasen Ibaraki (the fourth one has not been revealed), but has since then retreated underground with the rest of the oni. As an oni, she loves drinks, feasts, and competition. Despite her small size, she is physically strong, and has, speed and mystic powers to match. Using her ability to control density, she can gather people to form a banquet, or she can scatter herself to become mist. In Immaterial and Missing Power, she made the residents of Gensokyo have feasts for several consecutive days, intending to draw the joyous oni from hiding.
Suika (萃香) is the Japanese word for watermelon, and so this became an unofficial nickname for her. Her name is likely a reference to Mount Ibuki, where the oni Shuten-dōji was born.

Imperishable Night

 

Species: Yōkai firefly
Ability: Manipulation of insects
Residence: Bushes, grass
Stage 1 boss. Insects collect around her, and so she often can be seen in the middle of a swarm of them. With her powers, she can manipulate the flickerings of fireflies with timed synchronicity, or summon swarms of poisonous insects to kill an enemy. Like insects, she is afraid of pesticides and the cold. She is seen wearing a cape and pant-like bloomers, which led fans to believe she was a male. She is often seen alongside Yuuka and other insect/bug characters.

Species: Night sparrow
Ability: Making humans insane by singing
Residence: Youkai Trail 
Stage 2 boss and playable character in Phantasmagoria of Flower View. Mystia is a night sparrow that dwells on a road near a human village. She conceals herself by blinding travelers who walk along the road at night, then lures them astray, after which point they disappear without a trace. She is carefree, loves to sing, and considers her nightly activities nothing more than a game. She cooks grilled lamprey, because, as a night sparrow, she is upset by other birds being eaten as yakitori. An incident in Imperishable Night in which she was apparently eaten by Yuyuko made her a popular joke character. However, she returned in Phantasmagoria of Flower View.

 
Species: Were-hakutaku
Ability: Power to consume history (as a human) and create history (as a hakutaku)
Residence: Human Village
Stage 3 boss. Although half-human and half-beast, she appears perfectly human, except during a full moon, when she grows horns. She was not born with therianthropy, and only became a were-hakutaku due to an unknown incident. She loves humans, and considers it her duty to protect the human village, by consuming the village's history to hide it when malicious yōkai pass by. However, she is trigger-happy and sometimes mistakes ordinary travelers for such malicious yōkai. Keine opened a terakoya in the village and spends her time teaching children and compiling historical records. She seems to be good friends with Fujiwara no Mokou.

Species: Yōkai rabbit
Ability: Power to confer good luck to humans
Residence: Eientei
Age At least 1,300 years old 
Stage 5 midboss and playable character in Phantasmagoria of Flower View. Based upon the "White Hare of Inaba" story of the Kojiki, she evolved into a yōkai from a rabbit due to her longevity. She is the leader of the earthly bunnies of the Eientei, despite her deceitful personality. She is also a lucky charm - humans who get lost in the forest can depend on her fortune to find their way, though the humans often aren't aware they can use her fortune for greater things.

Species: Moon rabbit
Ability: Power to manipulate insanity
Residence: Eientei
Stage 5 boss and playable character in Phantasmagoria of Flower View, Scarlet Weather Rhapsody, Legacy in Lunatic Kingdom, and the PlayStation 4 version of Urban Legend in Limbo. A moon rabbit, she came to Gensokyo about 30 years ago to escape a war between Earth and the Moon. Since then, she has been an apprentice to Eirin, a pet to Kaguya, and a caretaker to Tewi. She has the power to drive people insane with her eyes by inducing hallucinations, and can also use her eyes to communicate telepathically with her kind. She also has control over waves of all kinds, such as light waves, brainwaves, electromagnetic waves, as well as sound waves, demonstrated during her story in Phantasmagoria of Flower View. "Udongein" and "Inaba" are both nicknames, the first given her by Eirin and the second Kaguya; the latter is what Kaguya calls all rabbits. Despite her power over insanity, Reisen is portrayed as one of the most level-headed and serious characters in the series. 

According to a series of yonkoma manga, Inaba of The Moon and Inaba of The Earth, despite the care she generally got, Reisen is often abused by her mistress Kaguya and teacher Eirin. She is also often the subject of many pranks made by Tewi. However, it is important to note that Inaba of the Moon and Inaba of the Earth's canonicity is highly debatable, due to its nature being comedic and over-the-top, as befits a yonkoma, its events also being contradictory to established facts, and the fact that ZUN was only loosely involved in its creation.

Species: Human (Lunarian)
Ability: Power to create any drug, natural genius
Residence: Eientei
Boss of Final Stage A and midboss of Final Stage B. A genius pharmacist who once lived on the moon. Kaguya persuaded her to produce the forbidden Hourai Elixir (the elixir of life) and consumed it. They were found out, but only Kaguya was punished and sent to the Earth, a fact which Eirin always felt guilty about. The Moon Court eventually pardoned Kaguya and summoned her back. Eirin and a handful of emissaries were sent to retrieve her, but Eirin found out that Kaguya didn't want to return to the moon. Acting out of her past guilt, Eirin betrayed and murdered all the other emissaries under the eyes of the earthlings who had fostered Kaguya. Eirin bribed the earthlings with the Hourai Elixir, in order to keep them silent, and went into hiding with Kaguya in Gensokyo. She is based on the Japanese goddess Omoikane.

Species: Human (Lunarian)
Ability: Manipulation of eternity and the instantaneous
Residence: Eientei
Boss of Final Stage B, Kaguya is actually the Princess Kaguya from The Tale of the Bamboo Cutter. A princess of the moon, after consuming the forbidden Hourai Elixir and becoming immortal, she was punished by being exiled to live on the Earth. Later, she was pardoned and ordered to return to the moon. However, she preferred her common life on Earth to that as a princess on the moon. Eirin helped her escape the emissaries, and the two went into hiding in Gensokyo. She has also been selling Yagokoro medicine and hosting exhibitions showing various items from the moon. In dōjinshi and fanworks, she is often portrayed as a freeter who lays around Eientei all day.

Species: Human
Ability: Manipulation of fire, eternal youth, immortality
Residence: Bamboo Forest of the Lost
Extra Stage boss. Mokou was the daughter of a nobleman (assumed to be Fujiwara no Fuhito), one of Kaguya's suitors during her initial exile on Earth. When he was humiliated by Kaguya's five impossible requests, Mokou came to hate her. She wanted to take revenge, but Kaguya disappeared before she was able to do anything, so Mokou consoled herself by stealing the Hourai Elixir that Eirin had bribed the other humans with, and drank it to become immortal. She eventually found herself unable to remain in human society, and moved to Gensokyo, wherein she found Kaguya was also a fugitive. Both her and Kaguya continue to resent each other, and routinely kill one another, and though she resurrects herself each timed, she still experiences pain. She has control over the flames of the phoenix.

Phantasmagoria of Flower View

Species: Crow tengu
Ability: Manipulation of wind, exceptional speed
Residence: Yōkai Mountain
Playable character in Phantasmagoria of Flower View, Subterranean Animism, Double Spoiler, Hidden Star in Four Seasons, Scarlet Weather Rhapsody, Hisoutensoku, and is the only playable character of Shoot the Bullet, making her the first sole playable character in a Touhou game other than Reimu, and the main character of the fanbook Bohemian Archive in Japanese Red, Stage 4 boss in Mountain of Faith, and also appears in Fairy Wars and Impossible Spell Card. Aya is the sole reporter, photographer, and distributor of the Bunbunmaru Shinbun ('Sentence sentence period newspaper'). She is often serious and appears to take her job quite seriously which is at odds with her reporting, as her newspaper consists mostly of rumors, gossip, and other questionably accurate stories. Despite being the only periodical newspaper available in Gensokyo, Strange and Bright Nature Deity and Curiosities of Lotus Asia suggest that it's not very well received.
Aya does not like to fight unless necessary, though she has a disliking for those she thinks are weak. As a tengu, she has power over the wind and is the fastest flyer in all of Gensokyo, as well as eyesight that far exceeds that of most others. Her bullets are extremely fast compared to most others. Additionally, she is one of the stronger yōkai in Gensokyo, and has sometimes defeated opponents when only trying to cover a news story.

Species: Doll
Ability: Manipulation of poison
Residence: Nameless Hill
An abandoned doll who turned into a yōkai after years of exposure to the poisonous lily-of-the-valleys. She advocates for doll emancipation (though other dolls are not capable of free will like she is) and dislikes humans because of their manipulation of dolls. Because of this, Sikieiki judged her to be "too narrow in outlook." Perhaps affected by this statement, she made an alliance with Eirin Yagokoro, though she still wishes for the liberation of dolls. Her name may originate from A Medicine for Melancholy by Ray Bradbury. Additionally, the word melancholia, from which melancholy is derived, had two meanings historically, as a precursor to depression, and, in Hippocratic humoral theory, melancholia was a word for black bile. In addition to her attacks, she also spews poisonous mists on the battlefield, slowing the player's movement when the player comes into contact with them.

Species: Yōkai
Ability: Manipulation of flowers
Residence: Garden of the Sun
First appearing in Lotus Land Story, Yuuka is the second PC-98 character to appear in the Windows Touhou games, after Alice Margatroid. She also appeared in Mystic Square for the PC-98, and as a playable character in Phantasmagoria of Flower View for Windows. She loves seasonal flowers, and thus throughout the year will move to the respective places where flowers are presently growing. She has lived long enough to witness several major flower-blooming outbreaks, an event that only occurs once every 60 years, implying she's at least a few hundred years old, and Sikieiki once commented that she "had lived a little too long." A consistent trait across all games is her slowness, either as a boss or a playable character. Yuuka carries a parasol with her, which she described as "the only flower in Gensokyo that never withers", but this may be metaphorical.

Species: Shinigami
Ability: Manipulation of distance
Residence: Sanzu River
Playable character in Phantasmagoria of Flower View and Scarlet Weather Rhapsody, and Final Stage Boss of Shoot The Bullet. Komachi is a shinigami who provides passage across the Sanzu River, giving her a role akin to that of Charon in Greek mythology. Despite her rather important job, she doesn't always take it seriously and ends up being scolded by her boss, Sikieiki Yamaxanadu. Her name is thought to have originated from the famed beauty Ono no Komachi. Her attacks come in the form of holed coins, in reference to the "price" one needs to pay to cross the Sanzu River.

Species: Yama
Ability: Power to judge clearly as good and evil
Residence: Higan
Final boss of the game, and Stage 10 Boss in Shoot The Bullet, Eiki Shiki is one of the judges of the underworld. Her job is to judge the deceased and decide whether they get sent to Heaven, Hell, or somewhere else. As a part of her job, she can be rather moralistic and likes to talk at length about morals. "Eiki Shiki" is her real name; the "Yamaxanadu" part of her name is actually her title, a combination of her status as "Yama" and "Xanadu", the place she is in charge of. "Yama" means that she is a judge of the underworld, and "Xanadu" means paradise.

Mountain of Faith

Species: Goddess of red leaves (Kami)
Ability: Control of autumn leaves
Residence: Foot of the Yōkai Mountain
Stage 1 midboss. Shizuha and her younger sister, Minoriko, control the season of autumn. She is prideful, and likes to show the leaves to Minoriko, believing them to be the best aspect of autumn, but grows dejected when winter approaches.

Species: Goddess of abundance (Kami)
Ability: Control of harvest
Residence: Foot of the Yōkai Mountain
Stage 1 boss and the younger sister of Shizuha. As a harvest goddess, she is invited as a special guest to the harvest festival in the Human Village every year, and will not guarantee the humans a good harvest if she isn't. She can cultivate a harvest substantial enough to provide for everyone in Gensokyo, but may also destroy it if she desires. Like her sister, she is prideful and cheerful, but only during autumn.

 

Species: Curse goddess (Kami)
Ability: Gathering of misfortune
Residence: The Great Youkai Forest
Stage 2 boss. Hina is the head of the Nagashi-bina army, and gets her powers from nagashi-bina dolls which humans put their own misfortunes in and leave to float in rivers. As such, Hina is surrounded by curses and those who encounter her will run into misfortune, but she has no dislike of humans, and does not wish to see them hurt. Her danmaku is characterized by spinning, and the kanji for curse (厄 yaku), which is also seen on her dress, resembles a spiral.

Species: Kappa
Ability: Manipulation of water
Residence: Untrodden Valley
Stage 3 boss, also appearing as an enemy boss in Impossible Spell Card, and a playable character in Subterranean Animism, Hopeless Masquerade, Antinomy of Common Flowers, and Urban Legend in Limbo. An engineer with an interest in humans, she believes that the kappa and the humans were ancient allies. In-universe, the kappa are a race with advanced technology, demonstrated when the shy Nitori uses optical camouflage to conceal herself from the humans. As an engineer, she likes to disassemble and reassemble technology to understand how it works, but she is not able to make any tools of her own with magical properties. To carry all her engineering tools, Nitori is seen with a huge backpack, several times larger than her own back.

Species: White wolf tengu
Ability: Power to see a thousand ri ahead
Residence: Waterfall of Nine Heavens
Stage 4 midboss, also appearing in Impossible Spell Card and Double Spoiler. A loyal tengu who patrols the Yōkai Mountain and can see from distances up to one thousand ri (3,900KM or 2,400 miles) away. She attempts to scare intruders off with simple attacks before reporting them to her superiors. When not on duty, she plays dai shogi with the kappa who live nearby. During the events of Mountain of Faith, she failed to scare Reimu and Marisa away, so she was assigned under Aya Shameimaru to continue surveillance on the intruders. Her report led to the peaceful resolution of the tension between the tengu and the Moriya Shrine.

Species: Human, distant descendant of the goddess Suwako Moriya
Ability: Power to cause miracles
Residence: Moriya Shrine
Stage 5 boss and priestess (miko) of the Moriya Shrine, and a playable character in Undefined Fantastic Object, Ten Desires, and Hisoutensoku. Though she is human, she is descended from Suwako and has the power to create miracles due to her divine blood. In the past, people began to worship her as a living god due to these miracles, despite the fact that she was the priestess of another god and most of the miracles were her god's. Gradually, faith in both Sanae and her god Kanako declined and they chose to move their shrine to Gensokyo. In an attempt to gather the faith of Gensokyo's residents, she threatened to close down the Hakurei Shrine, which resulted in a sound defeat for her and her gods. In Gensokyo, her status is only that of a regular human.
Sanae is a rarity as she is both an outsider to Gensokyo as well as a human, and though there have been multiple characters who've come from the Outside World, only Sanae appears to have an understanding of popular culture, in once incident referencing mecha anime. Due to her position, she has trouble adjusting to life in Gensokyo, and is largely contemptuous towards yōkai. She has long, green hair with a frog head hair clip. Somewhat similar to Reimu, her outfit resembles a hakama with detached sleeves, leaving the armpits exposed, but Sanae's is white and blue. She also carries a gohei, but the paper decorations are rectangular, compared to the more irregular shape of Reimu's.

Species: Goddess of wind and rain (Kami)
Ability: Power to create qianResidence: Wind God's Lake
Stage 6 boss, also appearing in Subterranean Animism, Legacy of Lunatic Kingdom, Double Spoiler, Impossible Spell Card, and as a playable character in Hisoutensoku. Officially, a goddess of the mountain who inhabits the Moriya Shrine, but in reality a goddess of wind and rain. She is based on the Japanese god Yasakatome no Mikoto. As faith in gods in the Outside World declined, she decided to move from the Moriya Shrine to Gensokyo's Yōkai Mountain, to avoid being forgotten. She quickly acquired faith from the yōkai on the mountain — though it did have elements making it closer to a state of friendship. To acquire the faith of the humans and yōkai living elsewhere in Gensokyo, she sent her priestess Sanae to the Hakurei Shrine. She wears a snake-patterned shimenawa as her trademark, symbolizing her victory over Suwako long ago, in addition to removable pillars on her back. In the events before Subterranean Animism, she was the one that sent the Yatagarasu to Utsuho Reiuji so Kanako and Suwako could start their Mountain Industrial Revolution project using nuclear fusion power with the kappa. The project was a complete success.
Kanako is ambitious, and continually tries to increase her faith in any way that she can. Somewhat unusually for a deity, she does not demand formality in her worship, and is largely open towards science, to the extent that she wishes to transition towards being a goddess of technological innovation. She has no hostility towards humans, but will curse them, should they act disrespectfully. 
Her ability is to produce a single Qian (乾), one of the eight elements (Bagua) of Taoism, which is associated with creation, leadership and reliability. She is also called a 'wind god', which would suggest an ability to alter the terrain and weather, and alongside Suwako, she has been seen creating large structures and opening holes into the underground.

Species: Goddess of mountains (Kami)
Ability: Power to create kunResidence: Moriya Shrine
Extra Stage boss, also appearing in Subterranean Animism, Legacy of Lunatic Kingdom, Double Spoiler, Impossible Spell Card, and as a playable character in Hisoutensoku. She is the original goddess of the Moriya Shrine, and once the leader of Mishaguji, but was later defeated by Kanako. However, the people of her kingdom still feared Mishaguji and were unable to accept Kanako as their new goddess. The two created a false god, "Moriya", from which they could both gather faith. Kanako borrowed Suwako's powers, and silently ruled as the goddess of mountain. Already long forgotten in the Outside World, Suwako was untroubled as her faith slowly declined, but accompanied Kanako to Gensokyo nonetheless — despite their history, and their frequent disagreements, the two are good friends. Suwako is notable for her frog motif, and though, Cirno likes to freeze frogs, much to Suwako's annoyance, there is no major resentment between the two.
Suwako's personality is somewhat opposite to Kanako - she is laid back, and does not appear to be affected by how much faith she has. Additionally, she enjoys competition, but does not leave the shrine often. Her ability is to create Kun (坤), which is associated with acceptance, subtlety, and flexibility. Mountain of Faith displays rather little of her power, but in Hisoutensoku, she can summon magma, geysers, grow plants instantly, and bend rivers.

Scarlet Weather Rhapsody

 

Species: Yōkai oarfish
Ability: Power to read the atmosphere
Residence: Sea of Abstruse Clouds
Sub-boss of Scarlet Weather Rhapsody, and Stage 10 boss in Double Spoiler. An ambassador from the Dragon Palace who came to warn Gensokyo of an upcoming calamity. She is a lightning user, and most of her combat abilities center around lightning and her long scarf. In her official profile in Scarlet Weather Rhapsody, it is said that "she can read the mood of a place, and adapt to it right away. She doesn't try to break the mood unless there's a very urgent reason. Flexibility is stronger than stiffness. When necessary, she vanishes completely and parries any attack."

Species: Celestial
Ability: Manipulation of Earth
Residence: Bhava-agra (Naivasaṃjñānāsaṃjñāyatana)
Boss of Scarlet Weather Rhapsody, Double Spoiler, Impossible Spell Card, and Violet Detector and is also a playable character in Antinomy of Common Flowers. Tenshi is a celestial with a "sheltered upbringing", but not entirely aware of this fact herself. She is overconfident, does not consider how her actions affect others, and is sensitive to insults, but ZUN described her as "nice", and that Scarlet Weather Rhapsody was "all about others bullying her." Bored with her life in Heaven, and envious of yōkai creating incidents, she creates one of her own in Gensokyo by using her powers, along with stealing the Hisou-no-Tsurugi ("Scarlet Disposition Sword"), which has the ability to absorb the disposition of others in the form of a mist, manipulating the weather. She is adept at the manipulation of rock and earth: she can throw rocks like a projectile, and raise the earth around or in front of herself. Additionally, she is remarkably strong, likely because of the peaches she ate in Heaven, which have magical properties. Tenshi's name can have multiple meanings depending on how it is read - Tenshi (天子) literally means 'Child of Heaven', and it can also be interpreted as 'Angel' (天使). Hinanawi (比那名居) can be read as 'The Goddess of Earthquake'.

Subterranean Animism

Species: Tsurube-otoshi
Ability: Dropping onibi
Residence: Underworld
Stage 1 midboss. A bashful yōkai who likes dark and confined spaces, and suddenly drops from high places to attack. She appears in a well bucket and it is believed she rarely, if ever, leaves this. Her name is written in katakana as, according to ZUN, kanji would "make her seem too strong." As she has no official dialogue, and a sparse character profile, very little is known about her.

Species: Tsuchigumo
Ability: Manipulation of illness
Residence: Fantasy Wind Cave
Stage 1 boss. A cave-dwelling spider yōkai who is cheerful and enjoys fighting. Her ability is to spread disease, generally of the infectious sort, which is especially dangerous to humans, however she prefers not to use her ability unless needed. Her design resembles a spider - the shape of her dress resembles that of a spider and her buttons look like an extra three pairs of eyes. Furthermore, the name Yamame (八ま目) can be translated as 'Eight Eyes.'

Species: Hashihime
Ability: Manipulation of jealousy
Residence: Deep Road to Hell
Stage 2 boss. A bridge princess who lives on the route to Former Hell. She is perpetually jealous, to an irrational degree - even being jealous of those who are worse off than her. Though she may appear to others as quite normal, internally she is consumed by jealousy, and the only seemingly practical use for this ability is seeing the lives of humans ruined by it, from her influence. Parsee's boss theme is "Green-Eyed Jealousy", named after her own green eyes, and in Double Spoiler her title is "The Green-Eyed Monster." These are both descriptions of jealousy from The Merchant of Venice and Othello, respectively.

Species: Oni
Ability: Exceptional strength, unexplainable phenomena
Residence: Former Streets of Hell (Ancient City)
Stage 3 boss, also appearing in Double Spoiler. One of the "Four Devas of the Mountain" along with Suika Ibuki, she is referred to as "Yuugi the Powerful" within the four, due to her unmatched strength. As well as her physical prowess, it's been suggested she can produce heat by moving her hand, and flatten trees by screaming. She possesses "unexplainable phenomena", which comes from the Analects of Confucius, precisely what this consists of is unknown, but the Analects speak of "anomalies, strength, disorder, and spirits." Originally from the Yōkai Mountain, she and the other oni moved underground when humans began to shun the oni. Yuugi continues her cheerful sake-drinking life in the Ancient City of Former Hell, and carries a sake dish named the Hoshiguma Dish, which raises the quality of any sake that is poured into it. She is cheerful and energetic, and has little tolerance for the weak. Yuugi is unusually tall, has long, blonde hair, and a red horn coming out of her forehead. She wears a white shirt with a long, blue skirt, and has broken chains attached to her wrists and ankles. The name Yuugi may be in reference to 'courage' (勇力) seen in 'strength', as seen in "anomalies, strength, disorder, and spirits." (怪力乱神).

Species: Satori
Ability: Mind reading, hypnosis
Residence: Palace of the Earth Spirits
Stage 4 boss, stage 9 boss in Double Spoiler, and the protagonist of the manga Foul Detective Satori. Satori became the Mistress of the Palace of the Earth Spirits after the underground city was separated from Hell. Satori has the ability to read the hearts and minds of any living creature, and while most yōkai and humans are wary of her because of this, she is loved by animals, who normally can't be understood by anyone, and keeps many of them as pets. Little is known about her actual personality, largely due to the fact she is ostracized and so does not interact much with anyone else in Gensokyo. She also has some limited hypnotic abilities, which can bring traumatic memories to the forefront of someone's mind, or induce amnesia. During the events of Subterranean Animism, the Heroine invaded her home from above ground. After an encounter, Satori permitted the Heroine passage towards the Hell of Blazing Fires.

Species: Kasha
Ability: Carrying corpses, communicating with spirits
Residence: Remains of the Blazing Hell
A two-tailed cat who shows up as a midboss in stage 4 and 5, and turns into humanoid form as the stage 5 boss and Final Stage midboss. Rin (nicknamed Orin in the game) is one of Satori's pets, whose job is to carry corpses to the former Hell of Blazing Fires to regulate its heat, which she does with a wheelbarrow, and though it holds no special properties of its own, is described as "likely to have carried the most corpses in all of history." She also has the ability to communicate with the dead, and other ghostly spirits, and in combat can briefly reanimate corpses.
Before the events of Subterranean Animism, Rin learned of her old friend Utsuho's newly acquired power, and of her plans to conquer the above ground. She got terrified at the thought of her friend's future, and the punishment her mistress would impart on her (even though Satori never intended to, it was merely Rin's own paranoia). She decided to drive the evil spirits to above ground to lure the yōkai in and get them to help her, but instead the Heroine appeared before her, and when she was stronger than Rin expected, she asks the Heroine to help her and stop Utsuho.

Species: Hell raven with Yatagarasu
Ability: Manipulation of nuclear fusion
Residence: Hell of Blazing Fires
Final Stage boss, stage 8 boss in Double Spoiler, and a playable character in Hisoutensoku. Utsuho (sometimes Okuu) is one of Satori's pets, a Hell raven who has lived in the underground world for longer than its separation from Hell. Her job is to regulate the flames of the Hell of Blazing Fires. Before the events of Subterranean Animism, she was told by a voice (presumably Kanako Yasaka's) that she could swallow the god, yatagarasu, that was hidden in the flames to gain a power that would fulfill the wishes of both the worlds below and above the surface, the power in question being nuclear fusion. Utsuho decided that using these powers, she would take over Gensokyo. Her friend, Rin Kaenbyou, became worried about Utsuho, and drove evil spirits to the surface to cause an incident among the strong yōkai above ground, hoping that they would come down to do something about it and, when they got there, they ultimately defeated Utsuho and brought her back to her former self. Contrary to their expectations, it was a human that came, and not a yōkai.

Species: Satori
Ability: About enough power to manipulate the unconscious
Residence: Myouren Temple
Extra Stage boss, stage 9 boss in Double Spoiler, and a playable character in Hopeless Masquerade, Urban Legend in Limbo, and Antinomy of Common Flowers. Like her elder sister Satori, Koishi was born with the power to read other people's minds. However, Koishi knew this power of hers would make people feel uneasy around her, so she deliberately closed off this power (which weakened Satori's power as well). She sealed away her own mind to others in doing so, and even her sister would not be able to read her mind. Satori took pity on her, and gave some pets to Koishi, hoping that the animals would open Koishi's heart to others. The plan worked, and Koishi started to care for her pets, and would one day set out to seek the god who gave Utsuho power so that her own pets could use it too.

Undefined Fantastic Object

Species: Mouse yōkai
Age: At least 1000 years
Ability: Power to find sought-for objects
Residence: The Road of Lingering Snow (Stage 1), Makai (Stage 5)
Stage 1 boss and stage 5 mid-boss. Being a leader of mice and a natural dowser, Nazrin was commanded by Shou to search for the shards that fell from the sky and the Jeweled Pagoda of Bishamonten, but her dowsing rods brought her to the humans instead. Nazrin is easily frightened, and flees at the first sight of danger. She can use her dowsing rod to search for anything, provided she has a proper internal image of what it is, however food is the singular exception to this, as the other mice under her command would eat it before she could find any.

Species: Kasa-obake
Ability: Surprising humans, blacksmithing
Residence: Myouren Temple Cemetery (Ten Desires)
Stage 2 boss, Extra Stage mid-boss of Undefined Fantastic Object, and stage 3 mid-boss of Ten Desires. Kogasa was once an umbrella who was forgotten for a long time and thus became an obake. Beyond blacksmithing, Kogasa's only ability to speak of is surprising humans, but holds no malice towards them. She is generally happy, but can quickly grow depressed if things do not go her way - she has low self-esteem, and is annoyed when people don't take her seriously, and will often contemplate if she's better off foregoing her consciousness and going back to being an umbrella. Ultimately, she just wants to feel wanted, but is held back by her lackluster ability. The name Kogasa (小傘) means 'little umbrella', and Tatara (踏鞴) is the traditional Japanese method of smelting iron. She carries an umbrella that resembles a Kasa-obake, and is the only Touhou character with heterochromia: her left eye is blue, and her right one is red.

 
Species: Yōkai and Nyūdo
Age: At least 1000 years
Ability: Nyūdō
Residence: Myouren Temple
Stage 3 boss, stage 5 boss in Double Spoiler, and a playable character in Hopeless Masquerade, Urban Legend in Limbo, and Antinomy of Common Flowers. Ichirin Kumoi is a former human turned nyūdō user that the heroine encounters at the Palanquin Ship, which she guards alongside Unzan. Nyūdō (入道) is a Japanese term which literally means "entering the road", and is often used to refer to monks who have entered the road towards the path of Buddha. In the context of Touhou, it refers to Ichirin's ability to control her partner, Unzan, who will fire the danmaku for her, although the spell card "Electrified Nyūdō" has Ichirin firing it herself. 
Ichirin was once a human, but came into contact with the man-eating foreseeing nyūdō, Unzan. Ichirin repelled by shouting "The foreseeing nyūdō was foreseen!", which would normally make him disappear, but he was impressed by her courage and devoted the rest of his life towards protecting her. Over time, Ichirin's fear of yōkai ceased, which caused her to become shunned by other humans, and eventually became a yōkai herself. Her and Unzan are always seen together, and they reside in the Myouren Temple. Ichirin wears a headdress and kesa, giving her the appearance of a traditional Buddhist monk.

Species: Ship ghost
Ability: Causing shipwrecks
Residence: Palanquin Ship
Murasa is the stage 4 boss, the spirit of the former captain of the Palanquin Ship, which she drowned in. She now sinks any ships she comes across, but her ability is limited by the fact Gensokyo has no seas. Despite her rather morbid ability, she is still capable of empathising with humans, and is careful with who she chooses to drown. She wears a standard serafuku with a sailor hat, and carries an anchor.

Species: Tiger yōkai
Age: At least 1000 years
Ability: Gathering of treasures
Residence: Formerly Makai (Above Hokkai), currently Myouren Temple.
Shou is the stage 5 boss, and is an avatar of the god Bishamonten. Alongside the rest of the yōkai aboard the Palanquin Ship, she seeks to revive Byakuren Hijiri. She is generally dignified, but displays a wider array of emotion when among close friends. Her ability is to gather treasures, and she can use gems in combination with the Jeweled Pagoda to fire lasers which can eviscerate anything it hits, or create more gems, but most of her power comes from the Pagoda, and is quite weak physically compared to other yōkai. As a priest of the Myouren Temple, she is subject to worship.

Species: Magician, formerly human
Age: Over 1100 years
Ability: Magic
Residence: Formerly Hokkai, currently the Myouren Temple.
Stage 6 boss, stage 12 boss in Double Spoiler, stage 10 boss in Impossible Spell Card, and a playable character in Hopeless Masquerade, Urban Legend in Limbo, and Antinomy of Common Flowers. Byakuren is a Buddhist monk characterized by her serenity and dislike of conflict, making her liked by pacifistic yōkai. She is the chief priestess of the Myouren Temple, and teaches dharma to those who listen to her, and hopes to try and bring peace between humans and yōkai. Additionally, she manages funerals, and performs monthly sutra chant concerts, which both humans and yōkai attend. 
Her magic is primarily focused on enhancing her physical abilities, in particular, strength, speed, and senses, but when not under the effects of magic, these are all on a level comparable to that of a regular human. Byakuren possesses the Sorcerer's Sutra Scroll, which contains the sutras she needs to perform her magic. It is able to recite spells on its own, can hold an infinite number of sutras, does not deteriorate, and can only be used by Byakuren. The name Byakuren (白蓮) can mean white lotus (the white lotus being a symbol of purity), and Hijiri (聖) can mean saint, making one possible reading of her name Saint of the White Lotus. Additionally, the White Lotus was a sect of Buddhism that became influential in China during the 13th century.

Species: Nue
Age: More than 800 years
Ability: Making objects unidentifiable
Residence: Myouren Temple
Nue is the Extra Stage boss, also appearing as a sphere of light in stages 4 and 6, and as a boss in Double Spoiler and Extra Stage midboss in Ten Desires. Her ability is to conceal the nature of an object, making it look different to any person who looks at it, and she can also use this ability to disguise herself. She enjoys confusing people this way, and avoids letting people find out her actual appearance. Nue has several red wings, blue tails, carries a trident, and has a snake on her right arm. She wears a black dress, paired with black thigh-high socks, making her the first Touhou character to feature zettai ryōiki. The name Houjuu (封獣) means 'sealed beast', likely a reference to the fact she conceals her true nature.

Double Spoiler

Species: Crow tengu
Ability: Thoughtography
Residence: Yōkai Mountain
Boss of Double Spoiler and a playable character. She is upbeat and has a laid-back personality, but hates going outside and working. She writes the Kakashi Spirit News, which she gets information for using her power of thoughtography, and is the only rival to Aya's Bunbunmaru Newspaper. While her newspaper is more thoughtfully written than Aya's, Hatate's dislike of work, combined with the fact that her thoughtography requires information to have already been heard (rather than acquiring it first-hand), new publications are much slower. Because of the business rivalry between them, Hatate has a strong hatred of Aya.

Fairy WarsFairy Wars does not introduce any new characters, but three characters from the manga Eastern and Little Nature Deity and Strange and Bright Nature Deity do appear.

Species: Fairy
Ability: Detection of movement
Residence: Forest of Magic
Unlike the other two fairies, Star's ability relies on the stars, which means her strength is consistent, as unlike the sun or moon, the stars are always present. She is able to detect movement of any sort from afar, but precisely from what distance is unknown. She is the most level-headed of the three, though she still enjoys pranking others just as much, but she is selfish, sometimes using her companions as bait to make an escape. She has a mushroom bonsai tree.

Species: Fairy
Ability: Muting sound
Residence: Forest of Magic
Luna is a fairy whose ability is to mute sound, but uses the moon, making her vulnerable when it's not present in the sky. She is clumsy and has the most human traits of any fairy, as she likes to read, and tries to engage in logical thinking, but ironically is the stupidest of the three fairies.

Species: Fairy
Ability: Refraction of light
Residence: Forest of Magic
A cheerful fairy who likes to play pranks on humans, usually in the form of getting them lost. She manipulates the power of the sun, namely the power to control reflection, with which can make things appear to be invisible, but is evidently reliant on the sun, and less effective in the presence of rain. She lives with Luna Child and Star Sapphire in a tree house close to the Hakurei Shrine, and the trio often go out to prank humans. Sunny and her accomplices are from the manga Eastern and Little Nature Deity and Strange and Bright Nature Deity.

Ten Desires

Species: Yamabiko
Ability: Reflection of sound
Residence: Myouren Temple
Stage 2 boss. Kyouko Kasodani is a yōkai who can reflect sound waves, which allows her to create a danmaku from compressed air - Japanese legend says that echoes are the result of yamabiko manipulating the sound themselves. She is a priest in training at the Myouren Temple, and is one of its newer members. The name Kyouko (響子) means 'echo child', and Kasodani (幽谷) means 'ghost valley'.

Species: Jiangshi
Ability: Eating anything
Residence: Myouren Temple Cemetery
Stage 3 and Stage 4 boss, alongside Seiga Kaku. She is under the effects of an anti-decomposition spell, to prevent her body from rotting, but is majorly lacking in cognitive ability compared to a human. Her ability is to eat anything, and gain sustenance from it. Her name is likely derived from Miyako no Yoshika, a 9th Century Japanese scholar, who according to legend, 100 years after becoming a hermit, was spotted in the mountains, his face entirely unchanged.

Species: Hermit
Age: Over 1400 years
Ability: Passing through walls
Residence: Hall of Dreams' Mausoleum
Stage 4 boss, alongside Yoshika Miyako. Seiga Kaku is a Taoist hermit who tries to convert others at any opportunity. She is generally malign, manipulating others for her own benefit, such as when she revived Yoshika, her de facto pet. Similarly, she uses her ability to pass through walls to steal others' belongings and then sell them back to them. The name Kaku (霍) is Chinese, which, combined with the fact she is not native to Gensokyo, can be taken to presume she is most likely Chinese.

Species: Ghost
Ability: Creating thunder and lightning
Residence: Hall of Dreams' Great Mausoleum
Stage 5 midboss, one of Toyosatomimi no Miko's servants. Soga no Tojiko comes from the Soga clan, and is a vengeful spirit who uses thunder and lightning, both as a result of anger and as part of her danmaku. She has a short temper, and the fact she is prone to anger in the first place makes her rather unlike Mononobe no Futo, but she is able to control her emotions when speaking to her friends. The name Soga (蘇我) is taken from the Soga clan, an influential clan of the Asuka period of Japan, until they were overthrown by the Fujiwara clan in the Isshi Incident, 645. However, the name can also mean 'ego awakening', and Tojiko (屠自古) means 'ancient carcass'.

Species: Taoist, self-identifies as a shikaisen"
Age: Over 1400 years 
Ability: Manipulation of Feng shui
Residence: Hall of Dreams' Great Mausoleum
Stage 5 boss, one of Toyosatomimi no Miko's servants. Mononobe no Futo is a shikaisen (shijie xian), a hermit whose living body was strengthened by taking on qualities of the dead, and as a shikaisen, she is able to take on many potential forms, but largely chooses to retain the same appearance she had as a human. Mononobe is old-fashioned, unable to adapt to new ways of life, and she speaks in an archaic manner. Though she sometimes has trouble understanding others, she is kind-hearted, even if at times hostile towards yōkai. She has the ability to manipulate feng shui, the flow of qi, giving her control of water, fire and the wind. Mononobe's name likely comes from the Mononobe clan.

Species: Saint
Age: 1446 years (born 7 February, 574)
Ability: Listening to ten people speak simultaneously
Residence: Divine Spirit Mausoleum
Stage 6 boss. A Saint living inside the Hall of Dreams' Mausoleum. She is easygoing, and does not appear to take things very seriously, nor does she attempt to try and aggressively convert others to her faith. Though relaxed, she is respectful of others and friendly towards humans. Her ability to listen to ten people at once is reliant on desires (and is the origin of the name Ten Desires), as she was completely unable to understand Youmu Konpaku, who had no desire of life or death, which would suggest rather than listen to people directly, she identifies their desires, and responds to those, rather than their words. Her character design is largely based on Prince Shōtoku, and is the only Touhou character whose exact birth date has been officially revealed. The name Toyosatomimi no Miko (豊聡耳神子) is derived from one of the names given to Prince Shōtoku in the Nihon Shoki, Umayato-no-toyotomimi-no-miko (厩戸豊聡耳皇子).

Species: Tanuki
Ability: Disguise
Residence: Myouren Temple
Extra Stage boss. An easygoing yet confident bake-danuki who speaks like an old woman. Mamizou has the ability to disguise herself and the objects around her. She is able to affect them directly, unlike Nue who merely obfuscates peoples' perception. However, she cannot hide her smell, which can leave her compromised. Mami, as seen in Mamizou's name, can be read in two ways, as 猯, meaning tanuki, or 魔魅, meaning 'deceiving spirit'.

Hopeless Masquerade

Species: Menreiki
Age: About 1300 years
Ability: Manipulation of emotions
Residence: Unknown, only seen in the Human Village during the Final Stage.
Stage 7 Boss, and a playable character in Urban Legend in Limbo and Antinomy of Common Flowers. A Menreiki who was born from the 66 masks that were created by Toyosatomimi no Miko, who later made the Mask of Hope for her own usage. Kokoro cannot express her emotions with her own face, and uses the masks for this purpose. While she has control of the masks (and thereby her emotions) when they are in her possession, should she lose a mask, she will no longer be able to control it, nor experience that emotion herself. After the events of the game, she grows less reliant on the masks and is able to develop a sense of self. Kokoro once lost her Mask of Hope, which caused her to lose all hope and made her dependent on others, but returned to normal once she acquired another one. This mask fell into Koishi's hands, and Kokoro resents Koishi, who refuses to give it back.

Double Dealing Character

Species: Mermaid
Ability: Increase in strength when in water
Residence: Misty Lake
Stage 1 Boss. Wakasagihime is a Mermaid yokai who lives in Misty Lake. She is mostly timid, and most of the other characters are surprised to see her taking an offensive stance. She is strengthened when submerged in water, which may explain why others do not see her acting aggressively. The name Wakasagihime is derived from the wakasagi, a Japanese fish.

Species: Rokurokubi
Ability: Detaching her head, flying
Residence: Human Village
Stage 2 Boss. A Rokurokubi who can detach her head from the rest of her body, and fly it when in this state. Sekibanki is slightly prideful, but does not take any effort to prove herself, and usually leaves others alone. Though she is a rokurokubi, they only have the ability to stretch their necks to an extent much greater than a human, with the complete removal of the head being a trait of the distinct nukebuki. Sekibanki appears to share characteristics of both, as while she can remove her head, she has the elongated neck of a rokurokubi. Additionally, rokurokubi have symbols on their necks indicating precisely from which point the head detaches, revealing their identity, and it is likely that Sekibanki covers up her neck for this reason. The name Sekibanki is spelled with the characters 赤蛮奇, meaning 'red barbarian anomaly'. Ban (蛮) is likely taken from hitouban (飛頭蛮), a Chinese creature similar to the rokurokubi, with hitouban meaning 'flying head barbarians'.

Species: Werewolf
Ability: Transforming into a wolf on a full moon
Residence: Bamboo Forest of the Lost
Stage 3 Boss. A werewolf with a calm temperament, who can transform into a wolf on a full moon, likely a Honshu wolf, a species that has gone extinct in the Outside World. The name Kagerou (影狼) means 'shadow wolf', and Imaizumi (今泉) is the same surname as that of Yoshinori Imaizumi, a Japanese zoologist who researched the Honshu wolf.

Tsukumo Sisters
Species: Tsukumogami
Ability: Making sound, performing music without instruments
Residence: 
Both Benben and Yatsuhashi Tsukumo are bards who were once musical instruments in the Outside World, but came to Gensokyo. When the Miracle Mallet was used, its magical power flooded into them, and they both became tsukumogami at around the same time. However, they quickly learned where their power was coming from (the Shining Needle Castle) and decided to overthrow society as tools, with similar motivations to Seija Kijin. Though called the Tsukumo sisters, they do not share a bloodline, but rather they both came sentient at the same time. They are both the Extra stage midbosses.

Stage 4A Boss and Stage 4B Midboss. Benben is calm and collected, making her opposite to her sister.

Stage 4B Boss and Stage 4A Midboss. As can be inferred, she is loud and energetic, unlike her sister. She uses her dress as a Koto to summon attacks.

Species: Amanojaku
Ability: Upturning anything
Residence: Shining Needle Castle
Stage 5 Boss, and the protagonist of Impossible Spell Card. An amanojaku who guards the Shining Needle Castle and serves as the main antagonist of the game, with her attempt to try and overthrow Gensokyo, in which she planned to give the poor and weak more power. Seija is extremely misanthropic, deliberately opposing others at any opportunity, which in turn has made her hated by others, but she enjoys being hated. Her ability is to completely turn over anything she encounters, reflected in her Spell Cards which allow her to rotate the player's screen, disorienting them.

Species: Inchling
Ability: Can use the Miracle Mallet
Residence: Shining Needle Castle
Stage 6 Boss. Sukuna is an inchling, a species of small humans, the most recognised one being Issun-bōshi, and Sukuna is one of his descendants. She can use the Miracle Mallet, a family heirloom, which allows its user to grant wishes at a cost, but it can only be wielded by other inchlings. In the events of the game, Sukuna uses it to increase her height, bringing her to a size comparable to a human child, but caused magical energy to be leaked into Gensokyo, resulting in disruption. She has a complex surrounding her height, and speaks in a childlike manner.

Species: Tsukumogami
Ability: Can make anything follow a rhythm
Residence: 
Extra Stage Boss. A Tsukumogami made from a Taiko drum who utilises the magic energy of drummers from the Outside World, and is seen with a drum set. She acquired magical power from the Miracle Mallet, but removed this power to become self-sufficient, recognising that this power would not last forever. She believes in freedom, and is helpful towards other tools (such as the Tsukumo sisters) in letting them acquire freedom for themselves. The name Raiko (雷鼓) consists of the kanji for 'thunder' and 'drum'.

Urban Legend in Limbo

Species: Ibaraki-dōji
Age: Over 1000 years
Ability: Communicating with animals, remotely controlling her arm, guiding yōkai, hiding her home with fangshi, creating light orbs, instant movement, creating barriers to and from the Outside World
Residence: Yōkai Mountain, also seen at the Hakurei Shrine
Playable character, and the title character of the manga Wild and Horned Hermit. Little is known about her past beyond the fact she is one of the Sages of Gensokyo (the others being Yukari and Okina), who created Gensokyo and separated it from the Outside World, and, according to the Bunbunmaru, she was acknowledged at Yōkai Mountain as early as 1980. Kasen has perhaps the largest number of abilities of any Touhou character, and she remarked to Reimu that her abilities are a "secret", suggesting that there may be hidden powers she has yet to demonstrate. However, the confirmed abilities include communicating with and guiding animals, removing her artificial arm and allowing it to act independently from the rest of her body, guiding yōkai, using fangshi and hermit sorcery to hide her home, producing light orbs of greatly various sizes, being able to move instantly, opening and closing the Hakurei Barrier at will, and she has claimed that she never uses her full strength when fighting Reimu as it would be 'risky.' Additionally, she owns the Ibaraki Box of a Hundred Medicines, which can cure any illness or injury from whoever drinks it, and if the drinker is healthy, then they will gain superhuman strength, but temporarily act like an oni.

Species: Human
Age: 15–16 years
Ability: Levitation, pyrokinesis (control of fire), hydrokinesis (control of water), telekinesis, psychokinesis, teleportation
Residence: Kantō, Japan, Outside World
Final boss who becomes a playable character, also a playable character in Antinomy of Common Flowers, and is the only playable character of Violet Detector. She considers herself above others, and has limitless confidence, but the events of the game lead her to respect the people of Gensokyo. Despite her hubristic behavior, she is rather intelligent, and gets along quite well with others. She wears glasses, a long, plaid purple skirt, and a black hat and cloak. She carries Zener cards and a Liberator. The name Sumireko (菫子) means 'violet child', meaning both her and Renko Usami ('lotus child') are named after flowers.

Legacy of Lunatic Kingdom

Species: Moon rabbit
Ability: Firing bullets from other dimensions
Residence: Gensokyo
Stage 1 Boss. Seiran is a military infiltrator of the Lunarians and member of the "Eagle Ravi" squad. She usually communicates to her kin via telepathy, as she has trouble speaking normally. Seiran is also the name of the Aichi M6A, a Japanese floatplane used during the Pacific War, but ZUN has confirmed that this was a coincidence, and the two have no relation.

Species: Moon rabbit
Ability: Becoming stronger by eating dango
Residence: Gensokyo
Stage 2 Boss. Ringo is an informant of the Lunarian military and member of the "Eagle Ravi" squad. With the leisurely job of Information Management, she is generally laid back and avoids fighting where she can.

Species: Baku
Ability: Complete control of the dream world
Residence: Dream World 
Stage 3 Boss, and a playable character in Antinomy of Common Flowers. Doremy Sweet is a Baku who can completely manipulate the world of dreams. This means she can create dreams herself, and observe other people's, which gives her a strong insight into the minds of others. However, outside of dreams, she is rather powerless.

Species: Lunarian
Ability: Reversing situations with words
Residence: The Lunar Capital
Stage 4 Boss. Sagume is a high-ranked Lunarian and goddess who has the power to reverse a situation with her words, meaning that if she says something, the opposite will occur. For this reason, she's careful with her words, and not very talkative.

Species: Fairy
Ability: Driving people to madness
Residence: Sea of Tranquility, near side of the Moon, Hell, Hakurei Shrine 
Stage 5 Boss. Clownpiece is a Hell fairy and subordinate of Hecatia Lapislazuli. She carries a torch, and any human who looks into its flame is driven to insanity, which was previously used to grow leaves on trees instantly, but this caused the flame to be temporarily extinguished. Clownpiece wears leggings and a shirt with an American flag pattern, which she wore after seeing it on the moon. Her character art has Clownpiece raising her torch, resembling the Statue of Liberty.

Species: Divine spirit
Ability: Total purification
Residence: 
Final Boss, and the individual responsible for orchestrating the invasion of the Moon. Junko is a divine spirit who is able to purify anything, meaning that she can remove impurities, similar to refinement of metals. She used this power on her own hatred of the Lunarians, and on Clownpiece and other fairies to strengthen them, facilitating the invasion of the Moon, in which she planned to kill Chang'e. Nothing is known about Junko's origin, but she appears to be Chinese. She wears a liangbatou, which is Chinese in origin, and ZUN said "Junko is a character to be contrasted with Hecatia. She has more of a Chinese feel, and she seems strong in a simple way. That's it."

Species: Goddess
Ability: Having three bodies in a single mind
Residence: Hell
Extra Stage Boss. Hecatia Lapislazuli is the goddess of Hell, and formed an alliance with Junko to invade the Moon, with the same motivation – revenge against Chang'e, whose husband, Houyi, destroyed the sun, weakening Hell. However, Junko's ability means that this grudge was not entirely belonging to Hecatia herself. She has three bodies, belonging to each world: the Outerworld, Earth, and the Moon, which have red, blue, and yellow hair respectively. Unlike Junko's traditional and rather plain outfit, Hecatia wears a punk-inspired tri-colored skirt, a black shirt with the words "welcome ❤ hell", and a collar with three chains, each having an orb of the three worlds Hecatia has a presence in, and during combat, her hair and eyes change color. Hecatia's name is derived from the Greek goddess Hecate, who is sometimes depicted with three bodies.

Antinomy of Common Flowers

Species: Pestilence Goddess
Ability: Bringing financial misfortune
Playable character and final boss alongside Shion, her older sister. She is a habitual thief and extravagant spender, who cannot hold onto her money, so despite her expensive outfit, she is quite poor most of the time. Her ability is to bring others into a similar state, by convincing them to make exaggerated purchases.

Species: Poverty Goddess
Ability: Bringing misfortune, which extends to herself
Playable character and final boss alongside Joon, her younger sister. Her ability, which she seems unable to control, is to bring great misfortune towards anyone she encounters, making her just about as disliked as Joon. The only person immune to this is Tenshi, whose good luck is able to negate it.

Hidden Star in Four Seasons

Species: Fairy
Ability: Scattering scales
Stage 1 midboss and boss. A fairy who dislikes the cold, and is able to scatter the wings on her back, which she uses as part of her danmaku. She resembles the Asian swallowtail, and is acquainted with Cirno.

Species: Yama-uba
Ability: Creating sanctuaries 
Residence: Yōkai Mountain
Stage 2 midboss and boss. A recluse who lives a solitary, primitive lifestyle, and will chase out any intruder she comes across. Because of her asociality, little is known about her.

Species: Komainu
Ability: Locating Shinto and Buddhism
Residence: Hakurei Shrine
Stage 3 boss. A komainu who guards the Hakurei Shrine, though she was never asked to, and until the events of the game, Reimu had no idea who she was, as Aunn mostly stays hidden because of her weakness. She can detect Shintoist or Buddhist piety, and chooses to loiter around the shrines in which she finds it.

Species: Magician (formerly Jizo statue)
Ability: Using magic (control of life)
Residence: Forest of Magic
Stage 4 boss. And acquaintance of Marisa who was brought to life with the Forest of Magic's power, she is powered up by Mai Teireida as a test for the protagonist, but is defeated. Yatadera is the name of a Buddhist temple in Yamatokōriyama, which contains many Jizo temples, including the oldest one in Japan.

Species: Human
Ability: Drawing out people's vitality by dancing behind them
Stage 5 boss (with Satono Nishida). She is a servant of Okina Matara. With Satono, she dances behind people to help produce vitality. She is airheaded, and the only bokukko in the series.

Species: Human
Ability: Drawing out people's mental energy by dancing behind them
Stage 5 boss (with Mai Teireida). She is a servant of Okina Matara. Her ability is to help produce mental energy in humans. Though more discreet than Mai, she is still quite overconfident in her abilities.

Species: Secret Goddess
Ability: Creating back doors, manipulation of life energy
Final stage and extra stage boss. She is a God and one of the Sages of Gensokyo, and the master of Satono Nishida and Mai Teireida. She has no issue making grand displays of her power, cursing those who disrespect her, but blessing those who revere her, and she is capable of empathising with humans. Her main ability is to create back doors on anything, including living beings, as a means of teleportation, to send herself or objects elsewhere. Additionally, she can use her servants, Mai and Satono, to manipulate the life or mental energy of others, respectively.

Wily Beast and Weakest Creature

Species: Soul of a stillborn child
Ability: Stacking stones
Residence: Sai no Kawara, Sanzu River
Stage 1 midboss and boss. She is the spirit of a mizuko, a child who either was stillborn, or otherwise a victim of infant mortality. She has a fittingly childlike optimism, and greatly enjoys stacking stones under the Sanzu River, and holding competitions for it. Ebisu (戎) shares her name with a Japanese god who was born without bones, but became a god at the age of three.

Species: Ushi-oni
Ability: Changing the weight of everyday objects
Residence: Sanzu River
Stage 2 midboss and boss. Though she is initially hostile towards the protagonist, she is quite helpful in redirecting them. Her ability is to change the weight of objects she is close to, and carries a stone carving of a baby, which once given to someone else, can be made heavier and submerge them into the river. If someone attempts to cross the river without permission from a shinigami, they will be attacked by giant fish, and Urumi makes a living by catching and selling them.

Species: Goddess of chickens
Ability: Healing throat illnesses
Residence: Yōkai Mountain
Stage 3 midboss and boss, Extra stage midboss. She is a self-described 'birdbrain', but still is reasonably intelligent, and only attacks the protagonist out of a concern for their own welfare. Her name is derived from kutakake, an archaic word for chicken in Japanese.

Species: Jidiao
Ability: Making people lose the will to fight back
Stage 4 midboss and boss. She orchestrated the incident, by sending beast spirits to the Human Realm in search of a human who can help the beasts defeat Keiki. Despite a polite and helpful facade, she is highly manipulative. She is in control of the Kiketsu (鬼傑) family, whose name roughly translates to 'devilish excellence'.

Species: Haniwa
Ability: Directly turning her loyalty into strength
Residence: Primate Spirit Garden
Stage 5 midboss and boss, and Stage 6 midboss. She is a servant of Keiki, the commander of her idol army, and has a vigilant, soldierly attitude. She carries a haniwa as a weapon, and wears yellow lamellar armor.

Species: Goddess
Ability: Creating idols
Final boss. She creates idols, which are animated by faith, who she can use to work or fight for her, similar to Alice's dolls, but it's said anything Keiki creates has a soul. Despite her somewhat conniving and usurping behavior, she is quite polite, and likes to avoid conflict. She makes peace with Reimu and Marisa by offering to create a shintai for the Hakurei Shrine, and a figure of Marisa, respectively.

Species: Kurokoma
Ability: Unmatched leg strength
Extra stage boss. Ambitious in character, she is the leader of the wolf spirits, and unsuccessfully tried to overthrow Hell after hearing of Keiki's defeat. Her outfit is similar to that of a cowboy.

Sunken Fossil World

Species: Taotie
Ability: Capable of absorbing anything
Final boss. She leads the eagle spirits. She carries a large spork. She can gain the powers of anything she absorbs. She defeats all of the heroines standing in her path, until Okina Matara makes Flandre Scarlet defeat her, since her pure destructive energy cannot be absorbed by Toutetsu’s special ability.

Unconnected Marketeers

Species: Maneki-neko
Ability: Beckoning in money or customers
Stage 1 midboss and boss. She is supposed to be a maneki-neko, but since she was born a calico cat, she struggled and decided to live on the mountains by her own. She makes the protagonist buy a card from her. She can beckon in either money or customers, but beckoning one causes her to lose the other.

Species: Yamawaro
Ability: Manipulating forest qi
Stage 2 midboss and boss. She is the leader of the Yamawaro on Yōkai Mountain. She is slightly more polite than other members of her society. She softens during business.

Species: Yamajorou 
Ability: Controlling people's minds with tobacco smoke
Stage 3 midboss and boss. She is the owner of a gambling den on the Yōkai Mountain plateaus. Her personality is gruff and curt. With her ability, she calms down the gambling patrons if they use up all their money.

Species: Goddess
Ability: Capable of making magatama
Stage 4 Boss. She makes jewelry for a living, and can also make yin-yang orbs. She made Reimu's yin-yang orbs, which are her primary weapons throughout the series.

Species: Kuda-gitsune
Ability: Capable of slipping into places where one's soul is weak
Stage 5 Midboss.

Species: Great Tengu
Ability: Capable of manipulating the starry sky
Stage 5 Boss.

Species: Goddess
Ability: Capable of letting one relinquish ownership
Stage 6 Boss. She can return something to someone that they loses, throws away or gives away.

Species: Ōmukade
Ability: Capable of eating dragons
Extra Stage Boss. She has a masculine personality and enjoys fighting.

Other characters

Species: Human
Ability: Telling the time by looking at the stars, and her location by looking at the moon
Residence: Kyoto, Japan, Outside World
Renko Usami is a physics student from Japan. She and her friend Maribel form the two-person occult circle, the Secret Sealing Club, which investigates Gensokyo, but Maribel is the only one who's actually visited Gensokyo. She is from the short stories that come with ZUN's music collections.

Species: Human
Ability: Seeing any boundary
Residence: Kyoto, originally from outside Japan
Nicknamed Merry by Renko, Maribel is a psychology student and friend of Renko. She and Renko form the two-person occult circle, the Secret Sealing Club, which investigates Gensokyo. Descended from a long line of magicians, she is one of the few humans who can perceive and cross Gensokyo's boundaries, and can also visit it in her dreams. There has been no official romanization of her name, and thus Maribel is unofficial, Merryberry and Maribelle being suggestions of possible alternatives. She is from the short stories that come with ZUN's music collections.

Rinnosuke is a half-human and the protagonist of the short story compilation Curiosities of Lotus Asia, a background character in Hopeless Masquerade, and one of the few males in Gensokyo. He runs the Kourindou, an antique store, which sells many artifacts from the Outside World, (buying them from Yukari) and is the only place in Gensokyo that does, but he values his merchandise so highly that he never manages to make a sale. As a result, in actuality, his store is mostly just a place for Reimu, Marisa, and Sakuya to lounge around in. Marisa and Rinnosuke in particular have a good relationship, as Rinnosuke once helped out her father, who created the Mini-Hakkero for her.

Protagonist of the book Perfect Memento in Strict Sense, and its spinoff manga, Memorizable Gensokyo. She is the ninth Child of Maire, giving her all of their memories, as well as never forgetting any that she produces herself. She takes on the role of a local historian, documenting the various creatures living in Gensokyo.

Princess of the moon with her older sister, Yorihime. Like her sister, she has exceptionally powerful abilities – her good fortune means that she has faced very little hardships in her life, and is able to move between the sea (the Moon) and mountains (Gensokyo) with ease. Though it has not been used, she carries a fan that she claims could cause a wind that would instantly purify the entire forest to an atomic level. She has only appeared in the manga Inaba of the Moon and Inaba of the Earth and Silent Sinner in Blue.

Princess of the moon, alongside her younger sister, Toyohime. She can summon the power of the gods, meaning the precise attacks she inflicts are dependent on the god that was summoned. Examples include causing lightning (from Hono-ikazuchi), using the sun (from Amaterasu), and making herself immune to bullets (from Ame-no-Uzume). Additionally, she carries a sword, and is extremely proficient with it, but the extent of this power has not been properly displayed, because it is largely outclassed by her other powers. Like her sister, she has only appeared in the manga Inaba of the Moon and Inaba of the Earth and Silent Sinner in Blue, and ZUN has said that she is too powerful to be put in any game.

A moon rabbit (not related to Udonge) who attempted to flee from the Moon to Earth, but was caught by Eirin Yagokoro, and as punishment for her crime, she was sentenced to be a pet for the Watatsuki sisters, who named her Reisen after their former pet, Reisen Udongein Inaba. Her original name is unknown. She can communicate with other moon rabbits using her ears, in which their feelings are transmitted. She has appeared in Silent Sinner in Blue, Cage in Lunatic Runagate, and Inaba of the Moon and Inaba of the Earth.

Kosuzu is the owner of Suzunaan, a book renting store. She was introduced as the protagonist of the manga Forbidden Scrollery. She has a generally cheerful and optimistic personality, and enjoys telling stories to local children, but overestimates her own combat ability and naively gets into situations she shouldn't, despite being easily scared.

Miyoi is a Zashiki-warashi working at the Geidontei pub, and is the main protagonist of the manga Lotus Eaters along with Reimu and Marisa. She can manipulate memories.

Notes

References

ZUN. Shanghai Alice Signpost. vol.1 2002/8/11 (Embodiment of Scarlet Devil readme file)
ZUN. Perfect Cherry Blossom Character settings. 2003/8/17
ZUN. Imperishable Night Character introductions and spoilers. 2004/8/15
ZUN. Shanghai Alice Signpost. vol.5 2004/12/30 (Immaterial and Missing Power readme file)
ZUN. Bohemian Archive in Japanese Red. Ichijinsha. 2005/8/11
ZUN. Phantasmasgoria of Flower View Character introductions and spoilers. 2005/8/14
ZUN. Perfect Memento of Strict Sense. Ichijinsha. 2006/12/29
ZUN. Strange and Bright Nature Deity''. Kadokawa Shoten.

External links

Characters category on Touhou Wiki for more detailed information.

 
Touhou Project